MTV Israel, is the Hebrew-speaking branch of MTV. It launched on 17 January 2011.

History
 Prior to the launch of a 24-hour MTV Israel, the territory was previously served by a localized version of MTV Europe, which was introduced to the country in 1990. In the early 2000s, MTV began to localize the European MTV feed in Israel featuring localized advertising and sponsorship.
 MTV Networks International signed a deal with Tel Aviv based telecommunications company Ananey Communications to launch MTV Baltic during the negotiations Ananey showed interest in launching a local MTV channel in Israel.
 MTV Networks International launched an on-demand channel found at MTV.co.il. This service launched on 23 October 2007. MTV.co.il featured localised advertising, sponsorship and translated shows. The On-Demand Music and Entertainment channel launched on 23 October 2007. During this tim MTV Europe continued to be available in Israel on cable and satellite television. While MTV.co.il served as an interactive music service.
In 2008, MTV.co.il increased its localised programming featuring a local MTV News series and other music based programming. The channel also features two local presenters.
In November 2009, MTV Networks Europe and its associated partner within Israel, Ananey Communications have announced that a twenty-four-hour Hebrew speaking channel will launch in the near future. It is expected that the channel will launch late 2010 or early 2011. Ananey Communications already hold a licensing agreement with MTV Networks Europe in relation to the local Nickelodeon within the region and promote other brands associated with MTV.
MTV Networks International also host a localised version of Nickelodeon in Israel and promote other brands such as channel E!.
In January 2015 the channel was split in two: MTV Music, which only broadcasts music; and MTV Series which broadcasts general entertainment and reality programming. MTV Series is only available on HOT.

Shows
 MTV חדשות (MTV News)
 Cribs
 אקסטרים אורבני (Extreme Orbani)
 ביוויס ובאטהד (Beavis and Butt-head)
Eye Candy

References

External links
 MTV Israel
 MTV launches Israeli channel online

MTV channels
Television channels in Israel
Television channels and stations established in 2007
Music organizations based in Israel